The 1949 Bulgarian Cup Final was the 9th final of the Bulgarian Cup (in this period the tournament was named Cup of the Soviet Army). It was contested by Levski Sofia and CSKA Sofia. It took three matches at Yunak Stadium to determine a winner. The first took place on 8 May, the second on 16 May and the third on 17 May 1949. The cup was won by Levski Sofia. They won the 2nd replay 2–1 after extra time.

First game
Levski Sofia 1–1  CSKA Sofia
Goalscorers: K. Georgiev ; Stefanov 
Levski: Apostol Sokolov, Stefan Metodiev (c), Ivan Dimchev, Amedeo Kleva, Kostadin Georgiev, Dimitar Doychinov, Borislav Tsvetkov, Vasil Spasov, Georgi Pachedzhiev, Lyubomir Hranov, Arsen Dimitrov
CSKA: Panko Georgiev, Borislav Futekov, Boris Trankov (c), Dimitar Tsvetkov, Atanas Tsanov, Manol Manolov, Dimitar Milanov, Kostadin Blagoev, Stefan Bozhkov, Gancho Vasilev, Stefan Stefanov
Date: 8 May 1949
Stadium: Yunak Stadium
Attendance: 35,000

Second game
Levski Sofia 2–2  CSKA Sofia
Goalscorers: A. Dimitrov ; Bogdanov , Milanov 
Levski: Apostol Sokolov, Atanas Dinev, Ivan Dimchev (c), Amedeo Kleva, Kostadin Georgiev, Angel Petrov, Borislav Tsvetkov, Vasil Spasov, Georgi Kardashev, Lyubomir Hranov, Arsen Dimitrov
CSKA: Panko Georgiev, Borislav Futekov, Boris Trankov (c), Dimitar Tsvetkov, Nikola Aleksiev, Manol Manolov, Dimitar Milanov, Gancho Vasilev, Stefan Stefanov, Stefan Bozhkov, Kiril Bogdanov 
Date: 16 May 1949
Stadium: Yunak Stadium
Attendance: 35,000

Third game

Details

See also
1948–49 A Group

References

Bulgarian Cup finals
PFC CSKA Sofia matches
PFC Levski Sofia matches
Cup Final